Doughboy Island is an uninhabited granite island in Corner Inlet near the northern coast of Wilsons Promontory, in Victoria, Australia.

References

Islands of Victoria (Australia)
Wilsons Promontory
Uninhabited islands of Australia